Vasiliy Lomachenko vs. Guillermo Rigondeaux was a professional boxing match between world champions Vasiliy Lomachenko and Guillermo Rigondeaux for the WBO junior lightweight championship. The bout was held on December 9, 2017 at The Theater at Madison Square Garden in New York City. Lomachenko and Rigondeaux are regarded as two of the best amateurs in history, with each boxer winning two Olympic gold medals. It was the first time dual gold medal winners fought professionally, and it was a fight the great Roy Jones Jr. stated, "To me, on paper, this is the best professional fight that has ever been made." Lomachenko won by TKO when Rigondeaux retired on his stool after round 6 after claiming to have injured his left hand.

Background 
On August 6, Bob Arum stated that Lomachenko would fight for a third time in 2017, likely on December 9 or 23rd. When asked who the potential options were, Arum stated, ''Well, there's a few guys. Rigondeaux if he answers Dino (Duva's) call. There's (Orlando) Salido, who's sniffing around and the third is (Miguel) Berchelt." Arum also mentioned lightweight contender Ray Beltrán, but said he would like to capture a world title at lightweight before a potential fight with Lomachenko. On August 14, Arum spoke to LA Times and confirmed either Rigondeaux or Salido would be Lomachenko's next opponent. He stated if the bout with Rigondeaux was made, it would likely take place at The Theater at Madison Square Garden and a potential rematch with Salido would take place in Los Angeles. On August 21, Arum stated both camps were closing in on finalising a deal for December 9. On September 15, the bout between Lomachenko and Rigondeaux was confirmed. The fight between Lomachenko and Rigondeaux will take place at 130 pounds. On October 3, Arum stated there was less than a hundred tickets remaining and the event would go on to be the biggest live gate in the history of the Theatre. On November 18, Carl Moretti of Top Rank revealed a re-hydration clause on the contract. Both fighters agreed to weigh in at 09:00 on the morning of the fight, where they would not be able to exceed 138 pounds. Any fighter over the limit would face a penalty of more than $10,000. On November 28, the WBA announced that Rigondeaux would lose his title at super bantamweight if he lost to Lomachenko. WBA president Gilberto Mendoza Jr. went on to say if Rigondeaux defeats Lomachenko, he would have five days to decide whether he is to return to the division or stay at super featherweight. He stated that special permission was granted because the bout was 'an important fight for boxing'. Upon receiving the news, Rigondeaux took to Twitter and stated he was disappointed.

Promotion 
On September 26, a promotional pre-sale began for tickets. Promoters, managers and boxers gave their thoughts on the fight.

In an interview with BoxingScene.com, Roy Jones Jr. was also asked to give his thoughts on the fight.

Broadcast 
The card was shown live on ESPN and ESPN Deportes in USA, and on Boxnation in the UK. The fight was also broadcast on Fox Sports in Australia.

Weights

Main event 
The official weigh in took place in the afternoon of December 8, 2017 in New York. Rigondeaux, who had never weighed more than 125½ pounds for a professional boxing match, came in a career-high 128.4 pounds. Lomachenko weighed in a 129 pounds, one pound under the super featherweight limit. It was noted, however, that the smaller, Rigondeaux appeared muscular and prepared for the biggest challenge of his professional career. On fight night, Lomachenko weighed 137.4 pounds and Rigondeaux weighed 130 pounds.

Undercard 
 Shakur Stevenson (125.2 pounds) vs. Oscar Mendoza (125.2 pounds)
 Michael Conlan (126.2 pounds) vs. Luis Fernando Molina (125.4 pounds)
 Christopher Diaz (129.4 pounds) vs. Bryant Cruz (132.6 pounds)

Fight details 
In front of a sell out crowd of 5,102 at the Theater, Lomachenko retained his WBO title, forcing Rigondeaux to retire on his stool after round 6. Rigondeaux stated he had broken the top of his left hand in round two, which was the reason he did not come out for round 7. After a good first round in which Rigondeaux landed a few shots, he stopped punching from that point on. If the injury occurred, it might have taken place in the opening two rounds. Lomachenko did enough to win rounds between two and six. Rigondeax became Lomachenko's fourth consecutive opponent to retire on his stool. The loss also marked the first time Rigondeaux had lost since 2003, when he was still an amateur. At the time of stoppage, Lomachenko was ahead on all three judges' scorecards, 60-53, 59-54 and 59-54.

In the post-fight interviews, Lomachenko was asked about Rigondeaux being his fourth consecutive opponent to retire on his stool, to which Lomachenko joked, "Maybe I should change my second name, now my name is 'No Mas Chenko'." He also went on to say, "This is not his weight, so it's not a big win for me. But he's a good fighter. He's got great skills. I adjusted to his style, low blows and all." Speaking to an interpreter, Rigondeaux said, "I lost, no excuses. I injured the top of my left hand in the second round. He's a very technical fighter. He's explosive. I'm gonna come back because that's what I do. The weight was not a factor in this fight. It was the injury to my hand." According to CompuBox statistics, Lomachenko landed 55 of 339 punches thrown (16%) and Rigondeax landed 15 of his 178 thrown (8%), landing no more than 3 punches per round. For the fight, Lomachenko was guaranteed a purse of $1.2 million whereas Rigondeaux earned a $400,000 purse. On December 12, Dino Duva of Roc Nation Sport, confirmed that Rigondeaux had bruised his hand and not fractured it, as initially stated.

Viewership 
The fight was a huge ratings success on ESPN. For the year 2017, it finished behind Manny Pacquiao vs. Jeff Horn at second place, averaging 1.5 metered market rating and 2.114 million viewers. The whole card averaged 1.3 rating and 1.73 million viewers, which did not include ESPN Deportes or the online streaming service.

Fight card

References

External links
 Guillermo Rigondeaux's career boxing record
 Vasiliy Lomachenko's career boxing record

2017 in boxing
2017 in sports in New York City
2010s in Manhattan
Boxing matches at Madison Square Garden
December 2017 sports events in the United States